Thomas Fanshawe (1607 – 1651) was an English politician who sat in the House of Commons from 1640 to 1642.

Life
Fanshawe was the son of Sir Thomas Fanshawe of Jenkins, Barking, Essex. He was admitted at the Inner Temple in 1620 and matriculated from Trinity College, Cambridge in  1622, being awarded MA in 1624. He was called to the bar in 1630 and became a bencher. 

In November 1640, Fanshawe was elected MP for Lancaster in the Long Parliament. He was disabled from sitting in September 1642.

Family
Fanshawe married Susan, daughter of Matthias Otten of Putney. They had a son, Thomas, Member of Parliament for Essex, and a daughter Alice who married John Fanshawe of Parsloes.

References

1607 births
1651 deaths
Alumni of Trinity College, Cambridge
Members of the Inner Temple
Place of birth missing
People from Lancaster, Lancashire
English MPs 1640–1648
Fanshawe family